is an international educational non-profit martial arts school. The school's name origins comes from the acronyms of Budo Ninjutsu Groups Association in Hebrew (ארגון קבוצות בודו נינג'יטסו: אקבן) the name "AKBAN" also comes from the Turkish word for light and the Japanese word for protection, A.K.A. the "Light guard". It is now used as a two syllable name.

The Akban school was founded in Israel in 1986 as a school based around Bujinkan Ninjutsu. Its syllabus has diversified into Historical European martial arts, MMA and Brazilian Jiu Jitsu systems but it is still koryu and Teki Kyoko oriented. It is informally identified as simply the organization or Irgun (translation: organization), and trains in Martial arts, Meditation, fitness and outdoor skills. Now having 12 dojos in Israel, the school's veterans instruct about 700 undergraduates and veteran students. It is rated by the Israeli martial arts community as the institution having the longest time to accumulate syllabus for applying for a black belt exam (12 to 13 years) in Israel.

History
The school was founded in 1986 in Jerusalem by Yossi Sheriff, senior instructor of Doron Navon, the first non Japanese Shihan in Bujinkan Ninjutsu school. Navon started teaching as a Bujinkan Shidoshi in a rural area at 1977. In 1992, in conjunction with Bujinkan Israel the school wrote and directed the first state sanctioned Ninjutsu/Budo Taijutsu instructor's course.
In 1995 the Akban School parted ways from Bujinkan Israel while maintaining presence in Hatsumi's Bujinkan events.

Functions
The Akban Institute offers classes for those who want to master Martial arts. The program is authorized as a non-competitive martial arts school by the Israeli ministry of Science Culture and Sports. The Akban School also issues ranks. The relatively long time span for belt exams stems from the large syllabus learnt. The modernized Kyu system is used and the minimum time in dojo before a black belt exam is 12–14 years. Today, Akban veteran instructors teach in fifteen main dojos (Main, School, International, Women's, Boys), plus a 'veteran' dojo for practitioners who have been training more than 20 years and special technique study uses.

Akban-wiki, The Akban project

General background
The Akban project is a non commercial, creative commons, effort to collect, create and freely spread knowledge about martial arts and related fitness programs. Its main features reside in the main website of the school. The chief feature of the Akban project is a community online encyclopedia. The main lines explored in the encyclopedia are martial arts and fitness.

Description of the Akban-wiki
The Akban-wiki has thousands of self produced articles and videos. It started in 1998 when two Akban veterans started organizing the vast X-kan syllabus learnt in Akban into a computerized database. The methodical backbone of this project was a system for allocating different stages of learning in martial fields called The Methodical Pyramid.  Many fields have benefited from the sharing and distribution of safe knowledge and training methods. The huge amount of material practiced in the necessitated means to organize and validate the techniques used. In 2005, the work on the database shifted toward a mash-up of user generated media. The work has culturally profited from the addition of Kaltura, an online application that allows wiki-like video editing and revisions by the wiki users. 
The Akban project organizes visual materials in a semantic web. This is achieved by installing a Semantic wiki and starting to apply interrelations between the techniques of same and different martial arts. The videos and articles are tagged with categories and the categories hierarchically nestle inside meta categories using a logical tree. The semantic functions allow the Akban-wiki skilled user to give each article and video attributes and describe the relations between them.

Grade syllabus
All students study and are tested on an augmented Bujinkan syllabus  and martial arts theory in addition to Judo, BJJ, Muay Thai and weapon katas from Tenshin Shōden Katori Shintō-ryū.

International seminars and events
The Akban School organizes international seminars for students of Akban veteran instructors. These seminars expand the Bujinkan syllabus practiced in the dojo and bring to Israel internationally acclaimed martial arts teachers. Notable teachers in Akban seminars are Renzo Gracie, De la Riva, Alexander Zhelezniak   and Hernán Cortés .

Akban veterans and able students are involved in extreme fitness events where sparring is practiced for extended periods of time.

Notes

External links
The website of the Akban School.
The Akban Martial arts and fitness wiki
A short video of the NHK Japanese television about Akban

Ninjutsu organizations